Vladislav Aminov (born 19 August 1977) is a Russian former swimmer who competed in the 2000 Summer Olympics.

References

1977 births
Living people
Russian male swimmers
Olympic swimmers of Russia
Swimmers at the 2000 Summer Olympics
World Aquatics Championships medalists in swimming
European Aquatics Championships medalists in swimming
Goodwill Games medalists in swimming
Competitors at the 2001 Goodwill Games
20th-century Russian people
21st-century Russian people